Pardines is a commune in the Puy-de-Dôme department in Auvergne-Rhône-Alpes in central France.

See also
Communes of the Puy-de-Dôme department

References

Communes of Puy-de-Dôme